The Shire of Tambo was a local government area located in central Queensland south-east of the town of Blackall.

The council consisted of a Mayor and 9 elected councillors. No wards or electoral divisions existed.

The Barcoo River travels through the shire's former area on its way to Cooper Creek and eventually Lake Eyre. Like much of the west, sheep became the mainstay of the economy. Today, cattle and tourism are of major importance to the region.

History 

Kargoolnah Division was created on 11 November 1879 as one of 74 divisions around Queensland under the Divisional Boards Act 1879, and included the areas of Blackall, Tambo and Barcaldine and parts of Jericho. On 30 June 1881, a new Tambo Division was proclaimed and excised from Kargoolnah Division.

On 11 October 1883, there was an adjustment of boundaries between Tambo Division and Murweh Division.

With the passage of the Local Authorities Act 1902, Tambo Division became the Shire of Tambo on 31 March 1903.

On 15 March 2008, under the Local Government (Reform Implementation) Act 2007 passed by the Parliament of Queensland on 10 August 2007, the Shire of Tambo merged with the Shire of Blackall to form the Blackall-Tambo Region.

Towns and localities 
The Shire of Tambo included the following settlements:

 Tambo
 Bayrick
 Caldervale
 Landsdowne
 Lumeah
 Macfarlane
 Minnie Downs
 Mount Enniskillen
 Scrubby Creek
 Windeyer
 Yandarlo

Chairmen
 1927: James Miller

Population

References

Former local government areas of Queensland
1881 establishments in Australia
2008 disestablishments in Australia
Populated places disestablished in 2008